Live at the Knitting Factory New York City is an album released on Mundo da Canção in 1990 by Telectu.

Track listing
 Untitled – 4:44
 Untitled – 10:52
 Untitled – 3:34
 Untitled – 2:43
 Untitled – 9:54
 Untitled – 4:52
 Untitled – 5:01
 Untitled – 3:28

Personnel
Jorge Lima Barreto: Samples, Computer Rhythm, Digital Winds
Vitor Rua: Guitars (Controller, Prepared)

References

1990 albums
Telectu albums
Albums recorded at the Knitting Factory